Petrus Johannes "Piet" Cillié (18 January 1917 – 20 October 1999) was a South African journalist and the editor of Die Burger from 1954 to 1977. He was strongly supportive of the National Party government  and has been described as with "most influential thinker", alongside Hendrik Verwoerd, in the Afrikaner nationalist movement in the early decades of apartheid. For many years, Cillié wrote a popular weekly political column for Die Burger under the pseudonym "Dawie." The first of these columns appeared on 28 January 1946.

References

1917 births
1999 deaths
South African journalists
20th-century journalists